The Provand's Lordship of Glasgow, Scotland, is a medieval historic house museum located at the top of Castle Street within  sight of the Glasgow Cathedral and Glasgow Royal Infirmary, and next to the St Mungo Museum of Religious Life and Art.

History
Provand's Lordship was built as part of St Nicholas's Hospital by Andrew Muirhead, Bishop of Glasgow in 1471. A western extension, designed by William Bryson, was completed in 1670.

In the early 19th century the house was occupied by a canon supported by income from the Lord of the Prebend (or "Provand") of Barlanark. Later that century it was acquired by the Morton Family who used it as a sweet shop. Following a generous donation Sir William Burrell, in the form of cash as well a collection of seventeenth-century Scottish furniture in the late 1920s, the house was bought by the specially-formed Provand's Lordship Society, whose aim was to protect it. In 1978, the building was acquired by the City of Glasgow who restored it. It was reopened to the public in 1983, and, following further restoration work which lasted two years, re-opened again in 2000.

See also
Provan Hall, another 15th-century historic building in Glasgow.
Bishop Dunbar's Hospital, the Hospital in Old Aberdeen founded by Gavin Dunbar (bishop of Aberdeen)

References

External links

Provand's Lordship - official site
Glasgow Cathedral Precinct -  History and original drawings of the Cathedral area

Buildings and structures completed in 1471
15th-century establishments in Scotland
Category A listed buildings in Glasgow
Historic house museums in Glasgow
Listed houses in Scotland
Hospitals in Glasgow
Defunct hospitals in Scotland